Zarni Min (also spelt Zarni Minn; born 30 March 1975) is a Burmese politician who currently serves as a Pyithu Hluttaw member of parliament for Shwegu Township.

Early life and education
Zarni Min was born on 20 March 1975 in Shwegu, Kachin State, Myanmar. He graduated with B.A. (Philosophy-Q),(Dip in International Relation), (Dip in Political Management) from Mandalay University and Rangoon University. His previous job was as a merchant.

Political career
He is a member of the National League for Democracy Party, he was elected as Pyithu Hluttaw representative for Shwegu parliamentary constituency.

References

National League for Democracy politicians
1975 births
Living people
People from Kachin State
Mandalay University alumni